Open Technologies Alliance (GFOSS) is a Greek non-profit organization founded on February 28, 2008 by 36 Greek Universities and Research Institutes. GFOSS was created to "further the cause of  Free, Open Source Software (FOSS) and Openness". 36 universities and research centers are shareholders of GFOSS.

Members 

 Greek Research and Technology Network (GRNET)
 National and Kapodistrian University of Athens (NKUA)
 Athena Research Center
 National Documentation Centre (EKT)
 National (Metsovian) Technical University of Athens (NTUA)
 Institute of  Communication and Computer Systems (ICCS)
 Greek Academic Network (GUnet)
 Athens University of Economics and Business (AUEB)
 Hellenic Society of Scientists and Professionals of Informatics and Communications
 National Centre of Scientific Research "Demokritos"
 University of Western Attica
 University of the Aegean
 University of Macedonia (UoM)
 Aristotle University of Thessaloniki (A.U.Th.)
 University of Patras (UPatras)
 Computer Technology Institute and Press "Diophantus"
 University of Peloponnese (UoP)
 University of Crete (UoC)
 Technical University of Crete (TUC)
 Greek Association of Computer Scientists (EPE)
 Hellenic Linux User Group (HEL.L.U.G.)
 Hellenic Association of Computer Engineers (HACE)
 University of Ioannina (UoI)
 Hellenic Open University (HOU)
 Harokopio University (HUA)
 University of Piraeus (UniPi)
 International Hellenic University (IHU)
 University of Western Macedonia (UoWM)
 University of Cyprus (UCY)
 University of Thessaly (UTH)
Open University of Cyprus

Members of the Board of Directors of GFOSS – Open Technologies Alliance 2015–2019 

 President: Diomidis Spinellis (Athens University of Economics and Business)
 Vice President: Nektarios Koziris (ICCS), responsible for innovation and entrepreneurship
 Vice President: Theodoros Karounos (NTUA), responsible for coordination and operation

Members:

 Mihalis Vafopoulos (ODI Athens), responsible for Open Data
 Vassilis Vlachos (TEI of Thessaly), responsible for Privacy and Security
 Panayiotis Kranidiotis (Scientific Committee of the GFOSS), responsible for Public Administration and Local Government
 Dimitris Kyriakos (EPE), responsible for Primary and Secondary Education
 Ioannis Stamelos (A.U.Th.), responsible for Higher education and Research
 Prodromos Tiavos (Creative Commons Greece), responsible for Open Content and Copyright

References

External links 

 GFOSS

Non-profit organizations based in Greece